The Battle of the Anio River was fought in 361 BC between the Roman Republic, led by the dictator Titus Quinctius Pennus Capitolinus Crispinus, and a group of Gauls who had encamped near the Via Salaria beyond the bridge over the Anio River.

Background  
Titus Quinctius Pennus Capitolinus Crispinus was appointed dictator in 361 BC, most likely due to the presence of Gauls and their proximity to Rome.  They had encamped on the side of the Anio River farthest from the city near the Via Salaria, roughly 3 km north of the Colline Gate.  Upon being appointed dictator, Crispinus ordered that the courts be suspended and that all men of military qualifications join him to march north to the river.  The army then encamped on the side of the river opposite the Gauls.

Battle 
Skirmishing began over possession of the bridge that crossed the river, but it yielded no results as both sides were evenly matched.  It continued on until a large Gaul came to the bridge, demanding that the Romans send their bravest man to fight him so that the standoff could be resolved. The Romans did not respond to his requests until Titus Manlius Imperiosus Torquatus approached the dictator and volunteered himself.  He confronted the Gaul, who was much larger and more well-armed than he.  Manlius managed to parry of the Gaul's strokes.  He exploited the Gaul's size and snuck between his sword and body, leaving himself unexposed and delivering a decisive blow to his groin and stomach, killing his enemy and therefore deciding the result of the battle.

Aftermath 
Manlius was given the honorary cognomen "Torquatus", meaning "adorned with a neck chain or collar," a reference to the chain which was borne by the Gaul whom Manlius killed.  The Gauls retreated east from the bridge to the town of Tibur, where they formed a military alliance with the Tiburtes, who provided them with supplies.  From there, they entered Campania.

References 

Anio River
4th century BC in the Roman Republic
Anio River
Anio
Anio River
History of Lazio